Ctenochasmatidae is a group of pterosaurs within the suborder Pterodactyloidea. They are characterized by their distinctive teeth, which are thought to have been used for filter-feeding. Ctenochasmatids lived from the Late Jurassic to the Early Cretaceous periods.

The earliest known ctenochasmatid remains date to the Late Jurassic Kimmeridgian age. Previously, a fossil jaw recovered from the Middle Jurassic Stonesfield Slate formation in the United Kingdom, was considered the oldest known. This specimen supposedly represented a member of the family Ctenochasmatidae, though further examination suggested it actually belonged to a teleosaurid stem-crocodilian instead of a pterosaur.

Classification
Below is cladogram following a topology recovered by Brian Andres, using the most recent iteration of his data set (Andres, 2021). Anders found that three subfamilies fall within the Ctenochasmatidae: Ctenochasmatinae, Gnathosaurinae and Moganopterinae, while also including several basal genera.

References

Ctenochasmatoids
Late Jurassic first appearances
Early Cretaceous extinctions
Prehistoric reptile families